Plaza de Panama is a plaza in Balboa Park's El Prado Complex, in San Diego, California.

External links
 

Balboa Park (San Diego)
Squares in California